Myrsidea is a genus of lice belonging to the family Menoponidae. The genus has cosmopolitan distribution.

Species
Selected species:
 Myrsidea abhorrens (Zlotorzycka, 1964) 
 Myrsidea abidae Ansari, 1956 
 Myrsidea rustica (Giebel, 1874)
 Myrsidea victrix Waterston, 1915

References

Lice
Insect genera